Sin3A-associated protein, 30kDa, also known as SAP30, is a protein which in humans is encoded by the SAP30 gene.

Function 

Histone acetylation plays a key role in the regulation of eukaryotic gene expression. Histone acetylation and deacetylation are catalyzed by multisubunit complexes. The protein encoded by this gene is a component of the histone deacetylase complex, which includes SIN3A, SAP18, HDAC1, HDAC2, RbAp46, RbAp48, and other polypeptides. This complex is active in deacetylating core histone octamers, but inactive in deacetylating nucleosomal histones. A pseudogene of this gene is located on chromosome 3.

Mammals have one paralog of SAP30, named SAP30-like (SAP30L), which shares 70% sequence identity with SAP30. SAP30 and SAP30L together constitute a well-conserved SAP30 protein family. Also SAP30L interacts with several components of the Sin3A corepressor complex and induces transcriptional repression via recruitment of Sin3A and histone deacetylases.

Proteins of the SAP30 family (SAP30 proteins) have a functional nucleolar localization signal and they are able to target Sin3A to the nucleolus. SAP30 proteins have sequence-independent contact with DNA by their N-terminal zinc-dependent module and their acidic central region contributes to histone and nucleosome interactions. The DNA binding of SAP30 proteins is regulated by the nuclear signalling lipids, phosphoinositides (PI). SAP30 proteins provide the first example in which the DNA and PIs seem to stand in a mutually antagonizing interrelationship in regard to their interaction with zinc finger proteins and thus exemplifies the molecular mechanism how these lipids can contribute for gene regulation.

Interactions 

SAP30 has been shown to interact with:

 HDAC1, 
 Histone deacetylase 2, 
 ING1 and 
 Nuclear receptor co-repressor 1, 
 RBBP4, 
 RBBP7, 
 SIN3A,  and
 YY1.

References

Further reading